Stefan Kozlov and John-Patrick Smith were the defending champions but chose not to defend their title.

Sanchai Ratiwatana and Christopher Rungkat won the title after defeating Kevin King and Bradley Klahn 7–6(7–4), 6–2 in the final.

Seeds

Draw

References
 Main Draw

Nielsen Pro Tennis Championship - Doubles
2017 Doubles